As Crazy as it Gets is a 2015 Nigerian romantic comedy road film directed by Shittu Taiwo and starring Omoni Oboli and Chuks Chyke in lead roles.

The synopsis of the film states: "A man who is about to propose to his girlfriend has his plans thrown away when a heavily pregnant woman shows up on his doorstep demanding that he takes care of his responsibilities".

Cast
Omoni Oboli as Katherine
Chucks Chyke as Ritchie
Aisha Tisham as Nina
Oduen Apel as
Titi Joseph as
Mary Chukwu as
Tehilla Adiele as
Ajibade as

Production and release
As Crazy as it Gets was shot in Abuja, FCT. It premiered at the Sheraton Hotel, Abuja on 3 May 2015. The trailer for the film was released online in June 2015.

Reception
Nollywood Reinvented rated the film 40%, commending the story for being "different", but criticizing the weak plot and the lack of chemistry between the two lead characters. It concluded: "...the movie is interesting in that it is different. Omoni brings a lot of life to the movie and the male lead, Chucks Chyke, does very well individually as an actor. Now there is definitely work that needs to be done with his responses to the other actors in the frame".

References

External links

English-language Nigerian films
2015 romantic comedy films
Nigerian romantic comedy films
2010s comedy road movies
Nigerian road movies
Films shot in Abuja
Films set in Abuja
Films about psychiatry
2010s English-language films